Daniil Andreyevich Kuznetsov (born 23 April 2003) is a Russian football player who plays as a winger (on left or right side) for FC Rubin Kazan.

Club career
He made his debut in the Russian Premier League for FC Zenit Saint Petersburg on 11 September 2021 in a game against FC Akhmat Grozny. He made his European debut on 2 November 2021 in a Champions League game against Juventus.

On 20 February 2022, Kuznetsov signed a five-year contract with FC Rubin Kazan.

Honours

Club
Zenit Saint Petersburg
Russian Premier League: 2021–22

Career statistics

Club

References

External links
 
 
 

2003 births
Footballers from Saint Petersburg
Living people
Russian footballers
Russia youth international footballers
Association football forwards
FC Zenit Saint Petersburg players
FC Zenit-2 Saint Petersburg players
FC Rubin Kazan players
Russian Second League players
Russian Premier League players
Russian First League players